Teodor Todeski (born 3 September 2002) is a Macedonian handball player who plays for RK Alkaloid.

References

http://www.g-sport.mk/vest-statija/66823/metalurg-odbra-naslednik-na-kuzmanovski

Macedonian male handball players
1999 births
Living people